Vlaško Polje is a village in the municipality of Knjaževac, Serbia. According to the 2002 census, the village has a population of 172 people.

Notable people
Ljubomir Davidović, Yugoslavian politician

References

nije vlasko polje nego Vlaska kod Mladenovca pod Kosmajem.

Populated places in Zaječar District